Bolivia competed at the 2011 Pan American Games in Guadalajara, Mexico from October 14 to 30, 2011. Bolivia's team consisted of thirty-four athletes in ten sports which is nineteen less athletes from the 2007 Pan American Games. Bolivia's wrestling, table tennis, beach volleyball, judo, and fencing teams all failed to qualify for the 2011 Games.

Medalists

Athletics

Bolivia qualified eight athletes.

Men

Women

Bowling

Bolivia qualified a pair of male bowlers to compete in the singles and pairs competitions.

Men
Individual

Pairs

Cycling

BMX
Bolivia qualified two male BMX cyclists.
Men

Road
Bolivia qualified one female athlete to compete in the road cycling competition.

Women

Racquetball

Bolivia qualified three male and three female racquetball athletes.

Men

Women

Shooting

Bolivia qualified six shooters.

Men

Women

Swimming

Bolivia qualified two swimmers.

Women

Taekwondo

Bolivia received a wildcard to send one female taekwondo athlete.

Women

Tennis

Bolivia qualified four tennis players (two male and two female).

Men

Women

Triathlon

Bolivia has received an invitational spot to send a male triathlete.

Men

References

Nations at the 2011 Pan American Games
P
2011